Milo Eugene Smith (born July 18, 1950) is a Republican and a former member of the Indiana House of Representatives representing the 59th district where he served from 2006 to 2018. On December 28, 2017, Smith introduced a bill that would require the Indianapolis Colts to offer fans refunds if Colts players kneel during the national anthem at home games. On January 11, 2018, Smith announced that he would not be running for another term in the State House.

References

External links
Milo Smith at Ballotpedia
Project Vote Smart – Representative Milo Smith (IN) profile
Our Campaigns – Representative Milo Smith (IN) profile
Office website

1950 births
Living people
Republican Party members of the Indiana House of Representatives
21st-century American politicians
People from Columbus, Indiana